Shelton Plantation House, also known as Hoskins House, is a historic plantation house located near Edenton, Chowan County, North Carolina. It was built about 1820, and is a two-story, three bay, Federal-period temple-form frame dwelling.  It has a small pedimented entrance porch.

It was listed on the National Register of Historic Places in 1976.

References

Plantation houses in North Carolina
Houses on the National Register of Historic Places in North Carolina
Houses completed in 1820
Houses in Chowan County, North Carolina
National Register of Historic Places in Chowan County, North Carolina